According to a 2005 report conducted by the Food and Agriculture Organization of the United Nations (FAO), Vietnam has the second highest rate of deforestation of primary forests in the world, second only to Nigeria.

However, regarding total forest cover, Vietnam has undergone a forest transition:  its forest cover has increased since the early 1990s, after decades of deforestation.

As of 2005, 12,931,000 hectares (the equivalent of 39.7% of Vietnam's land cover) was forested, although only 85,000 hectares (0.7% of the land cover) was primary forest, the most biodiverse form of forest.

Vietnam has some 1,534 known species of fauna and 10,500 species of vascular plants, according to the World Conservation Monitoring Centre. 3.4% of Vietnam is protected under IUCN categories I-V.

Large areas of Vietnam were deforested during the Vietnam War due to the use of Agent Orange.

References

Vietnam
Environment of Vietnam
Forestry in Vietnam